The NE612 is an integrated circuit for processing of signals, such as in the transmission of radio signals. It comprises an oscillator and a mixer.
It can handle signal frequencies up to 500 MHz and local oscillator frequencies up to 200 MHz.  The
The IC belongs to a family of the following ICs: NE602, SA602, NE612 and SA612. It is widely used in amateur radio applications, e.g. in the commercial Elecraft products, and others.

References 

Linear integrated circuits
Electronic oscillators